Lucia Peak is a peak  northwest of Adams Crest in the Ravens Mountains of the Britannia Range, Antarctica. It was named after Chief master sergeant Charles R. Lucia who served with the 109th Airlift Wing as Chief of Maintenance Control during the transition of LC-130 operations from the U.S. Navy to the Air National Guard.

References

Beale Peak

Mountains of Oates Land